Pistol River (Tolowa: chvt-ler’sh-chvn-dvn taa-ghii~-li~’ ) is an unincorporated community and census-designated place in Curry County, Oregon, United States. As of the 2010 census it had a population of 84. It is near the Pistol River and the Pistol River State Scenic Viewpoint, just to the east of U.S. Route 101.

The community of Pistol River takes its name from the stream that flows past it. James Mace, a militia soldier, lost a pistol in the river in 1853, during a skirmish of the Rogue River Wars, and it has been known as the Pistol River since then. The Pistol River post office was established in 1927.

The Pistol River area is known for its windsurfing, and the International Windsurfing Tour holds the Pistol River Wavebash there annually.  Many say that Pistol River has the best windsurfing in the state.

Pistol River has a concert association that has hosted a monthly concert, often featuring nationally known acts, since 1982.

In 1984 John Kirkland of The World (of Coos Bay, Oregon) described Pistol River as having a "pioneer spirit" and "simplicity". Kirkland added that the community could be considered "a throwback to an earlier point in American history."

Demographics

Education
It is in the Central Curry School District, which operates two schools: Riley Creek Elementary School (K-8) and Gold Beach High School.

The entire county is in the Southwestern Oregon Community College district.

Pistol River previously had its own school district, Pistol River Elementary School District. In 1984 it had two teachers and 17 students, with grades 1-3 and 4-6 taught by one particular teacher. The school held periodic social events on holidays, leading Kirkland to call it "the center of Pistol River's social life." In 1997 the Pistol River school district merged into the Central Curry school district, and the Pistol River School immediately closed. The Central Curry district later sold the school's land.

References

External links
Photo of a historic marker from Salem Public Library describing the Battle of Pistol River that took place during the Rogue River Wars

Oregon Coast
Unincorporated communities in Curry County, Oregon
Census-designated places in Oregon
1927 establishments in Oregon
Unincorporated communities in Oregon
Populated coastal places in Oregon